Giulio Cesare Casali (born 13 February 1942) is a Sammarinese professional football player and manager.

Career
He played for the A.C. Libertas and San Marino Calcio.

After finishing his playing career, he became youth coach of the same San Marino Calcio and then assistant coach of the first team. On 24 January 1986 he was appointed coach of the San Marino national football team, the first in history. The first call is that of 7 March 1986 for the match five days later, against the formation Danish team from Odense, unofficial debut of National biancazzurra. Following Casali has coached the national team for four more meetings before leaving the bench in 1990 for health reasons: San Marino-Canada Olympic (0-1, friendly, 28 March 1986), Lebanon-San Marino (0-0, Mediterranean Games, 16 September 1987), Syria-San Marino (3-0, Mediterranean Games, 18 September 1987) and Turkey-San Marino (4-0, Mediterranean Games, 20 September 1987).

References

1942 births
Living people
Sammarinese footballers
Association football forwards
A.C. Libertas players
A.S.D. Victor San Marino players
Sammarinese football managers
San Marino national football team managers
Association football coaches